Caldwell may refer to:

People 

 Caldwell (surname)
 Caldwell (given name)
 Caldwell First Nation, a  federally recognized First Nation in southern Ontario, Canada

Places

Great Britain 
 Caldwell, Derbyshire, a hamlet
 Caldwell, East Renfrewshire, an old country estate
 Caldwell, North Yorkshire, a village and civil parish

United States 
 Caldwell Glacier, Alaska
 Caldwell, Arkansas, a city
 Caldwell, Idaho, a city
 Caldwell, Kansas, a city
 Caldwell Parish, Louisiana
 Caldwell Brook, Minnesota, a stream
 The Caldwells, New Jersey, three municipalities all with Caldwell in their name
 Caldwell, New Jersey, a borough
 Town of Caldwell, renamed Lake George (town), New York in 1962
 Caldwell, Mecklenburg County, North Carolina, an unincorporated community
 Caldwell, Orange County, North Carolina, an unincorporated community
 Caldwell, Ohio, a village
 Caldwell, Texas, a city
 Caldwell Zoo, Texas, in the city of Tyler
 Caldwell, West Virginia, an unincorporated community
 Caldwell, Wisconsin, an unincorporated community
 Caldwell County (disambiguation)
 Caldwell Creek (disambiguation)
 Caldwell Township (disambiguation)

Elsewhere 
 Mount Caldwell, Ellsworth Land, Antarctica
 Caldwell Peak, Ross Island (near Antarctica)
 Caldwell, New South Wales, Australia, a village
 Caldwell, Cardston County, Alberta, Canada
 Caldwell, Liberia, a settlement town
 Forward Operating Base Caldwell, Iraq, a former U.S. Army base

Buildings 
 Caldwell, East Renfrewshire, Scotland, a mansion
 Uplawmoor (GB&K) railway station, Uplawmoor, East Renfrewshire, Scotland, originally named Caldwell
 Caldwell Priory, Bedfordshire, England
 Caldwell Block, Ipswich, Massachusetts, US
 Caldwell Parsonage, Union, New Jersey, US
 Caldwell Hall (disambiguation)
 Caldwell House (disambiguation)

Ships 
Caldwell-class destroyer, a class of six destroyers
USS Caldwell (DD-69), US Navy destroyer, 1917
USS Caldwell (DD-605), US Navy destroyer, 1942

Schools 
 Caldwell University, Caldwell, New Jersey, US
 Caldwell Community College & Technical Institute, Hudson, North Carolina, US
 Caldwell School, Mobile, Alabama, US
 Caldwell High School (disambiguation)
 Caldwell Academy, Greensboro, North Carolina, US

Other 
 Caldwell baronets, an extinct title in the Baronetage of Ireland
 Caldwell catalogue of astronomical objects
 Caldwell Memorial Hospital, Lenoir, North Carolina, US
 Caldwell machine gun, 1915

See also 
 Cadwell (disambiguation)
 Calwell (disambiguation)
 Cardwell (disambiguation)
 Cauldwell (disambiguation)